= Monte Porale =

Mountain in Italy

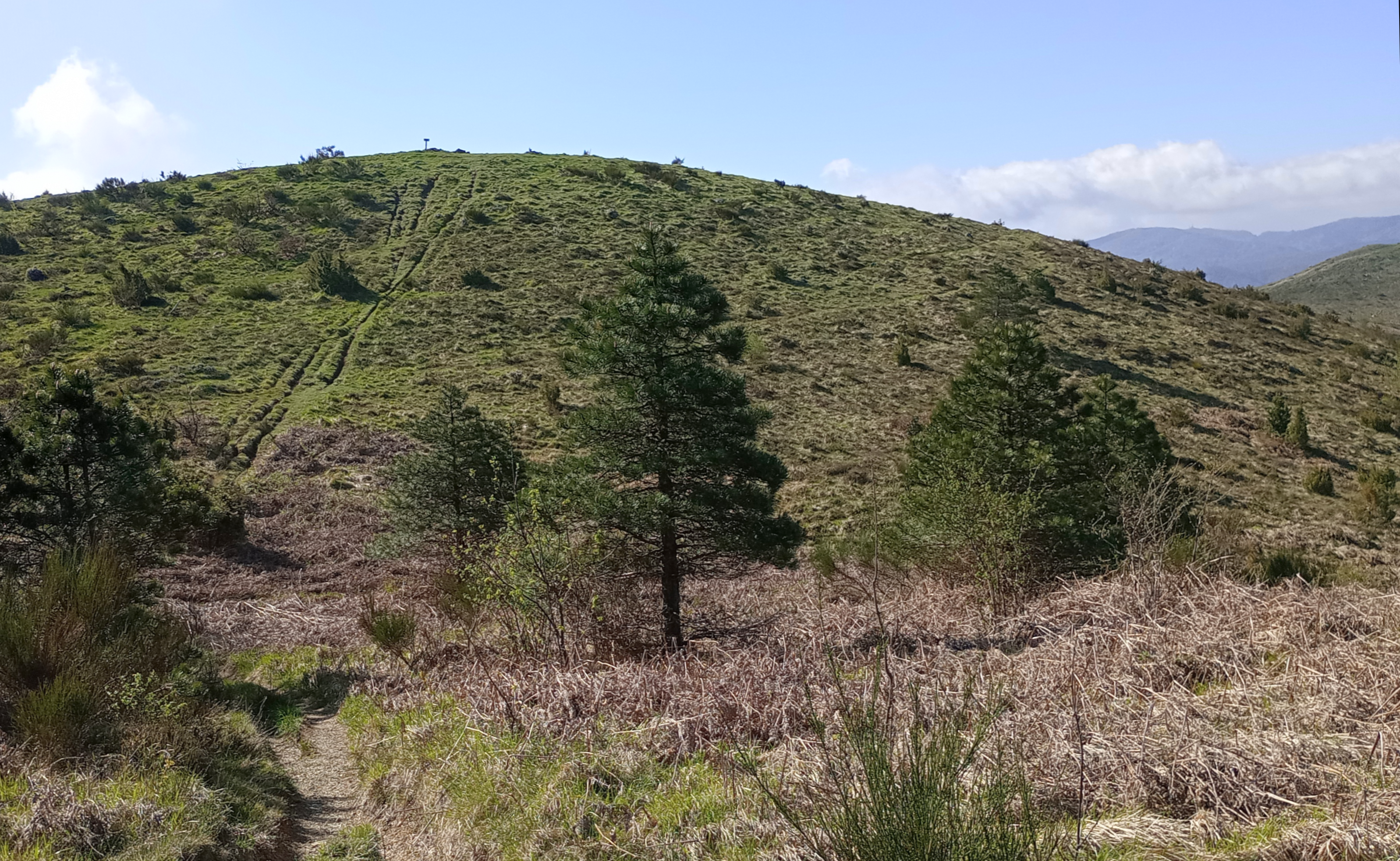

Highest point
- Elevation: 835 m (2,740 ft)
- Coordinates: 44°37′10″N 8°54′17″E

Geography
- Location within Italy
- Location: Liguria, Italy
- Parent range: Ligurian Apennines

Monte Porale is a mountain in Liguria, northern Italy, part of the Ligurian Apennines.
